Comilla-6 is a constituency represented in the Jatiya Sangsad (National Parliament) of Bangladesh since 2008 by A. K. M. Bahauddin Bahar of the Awami League.

Boundaries 
The constituency encompasses Comilla City Corporation, Comilla Adarsha Sadar Upazila, and Comilla Cantonment.

History 
The constituency was created for the first general elections in newly independent Bangladesh, held in 1973.

Ahead of the 2008 general election, the Election Commission redrew constituency boundaries to reflect population changes revealed by the 2001 Bangladesh census. The 2008 redistricting altered the boundaries of the constituency.

Ahead of the 2014 general election, the Election Commission reduced the boundaries of the constituency. Previously it had also included one union parishad of Comilla Sadar Dakshin Upazila: Galiara.

Ahead of the 2018 general election, the Election Commission expanded the boundaries of the constituency by adding Comilla City Corporation and Comilla Cantonment.

Members of Parliament

Elections

Elections in the 2010s

Elections in the 2000s

Elections in the 1990s

References

External links
 

Parliamentary constituencies in Bangladesh
Cumilla District